Pimpin' Ain't Easy may refer to:

 A 1989 song by rapper Big Daddy Kane from his album It's a Big Daddy Thing
 A 1987 song by rapper Ice-T from the album Rhyme Pays, parenthetically titled "Somebody Gotta Do It (Pimpin' Ain't Easy!!!)
 A song by Kodak Black, see Kodak Black discography
 A 2003 episode of the sitcom Yes, Dear
 The catchphrase of WWE wrestler The Godfather